Alfafara is a municipality in the comarca of Comtat in the Valencian Community, Spain.

See also 
 Serra Mariola Natural Park

References

Municipalities in the Province of Alicante
Comtat